Philip Singoei (born December 31, 1975) is a long-distance runner from Kenya, who won the Eindhoven Marathon on October 8, 2006, clocking a total time of 2:08:18.

Achievements
All results regarding marathon, unless stated otherwise

External links

marathoninfo

1975 births
Living people
Kenyan male long-distance runners
Place of birth missing (living people)
Kenyan male marathon runners